Top of the World Tour: Live is the first live album by American country music band Dixie Chicks, released in November 2003.

It records their successful Top of the World Tour. A DVD Top of the World Tour: Live was also released with the material of the tour. Both are composites of multiple shows. As of March 2020, Top of the World Tour: Live has sold 1 million copies in the United States and has been certified Platinum by the Recording Industry Association of America (RIAA).

Track listing

Personnel

Dixie Chicks
 Martie McGuire – fiddle, mandolin, viola, soloist, background vocals
 Natalie Maines – bass guitar, acoustic guitar, electric guitar, lead vocals
 Emily Robison – banjo, dobro, acoustic guitar, electric guitar, background vocals

Additional Musicians
 Roscoe Beck – bass guitar, upright bass, fretless bass guitar, electric guitar, background vocals
 Matthew Brubeck – cello
 Roger Cabot – Hammond organ
 John Deaderick – accordion, keyboards, Hammond organ, background vocals
 Jason Deleu – Hammond organ
 Drew Findley – programming
 John Gardner – djembe, drums, snare drums, percussion, tambourine
 Todd Green – Hammond organ
 David Grissom – 12-string electric guitar, acoustic guitar, electric guitar, electric baritone guitar, background vocals
 Emmylou Harris – background vocals
 Bob House – Hammond organ
 Linda Ghidossi de Luca – viola
 Ryan Merfy – Hammond organ
 Henry Metcalfe – Hammond organ
 John Mock – cello arrangements, concertina, acoustic guitar, electric guitar, irish whistle, percussion, string arrangements, tambourine, tin whistle
 Lorenza Ponce – violin, string arrangements
 Richard Randall – Hammond organ
 Michael Rhodes – bass guitar
 Keith Sewell – fiddle, acoustic guitar, soloist, background vocals
 Hiroki Tagachi – violin
 Brent Truitt – mandolin, background vocals
 Robby Turner – dobro, steel guitar, background vocals

Chart performance

Weekly charts

Year-end charts

Certifications

References

The Chicks albums
Albums produced by Paul Worley
Albums produced by Blake Chancey
2003 live albums
Columbia Records live albums